Ali Akbar may refer to:

Places
 Ali Akbar, East Azerbaijan, Iran
 Ali Akbar, Kermanshah, Iran

People
 Ali al-Akbar ibn Husayn (664–680), son of the third Shia Imam, Husayn ibn Ali, and Umm Layla
 Ali Ekber Çiçek (1935–2006), Turkish musician
 Ali-Akbar Davar (1885–1937), Iranian prosecutor
 Ali-Akbar Mousavi Khoeini, Iranian human rights activist
 'Ali Akbar Khata'i, the author of a book of China completed in 1516
 Ali Akbar Moradi (born 1957), Iranian-Kurdish musician and composer
 Ali Akbar Mohtashamipur (1947–2021), Iranian Shia cleric 
 Ali Akbar Nategh-Nouri (born 1944), Iranian politician
 Ali Akbar Sadeghi (born 1937), Iranian artist
 Ali-Akbar Shahnazi (1897–1985), Iranian musician
 Ali Akbar Velayati (born 1945), Iranian politician
 Ali Akbar (writer) (born 1978), or Alakbar Aliagha oglu Aliyev, Azerbaijani writer and journalist
 Ali Akbar (academic) (born 1952), Bangladeshi academic
 Ali Akbar (Bangladeshi politician)
 Ali Akbar (director), Indian film lyricist, screenwriter and director
 Ali Akbar (born 1984 or 1985), an American right-wing activist now known as Ali Alexander